Felicia Afrăsiloaie-Jitianu (born 16 January 1954) is a retired Romanian rower. Competing in quadruple sculls she won a bronze medal at the 1976 Olympics followed by a silver at the 1977 World Championships. She retired in 1978 after a car accident.

References

External links 
 
 
 

1954 births
Living people
Sportspeople from Piatra Neamț
Romanian female rowers
Olympic rowers of Romania
Rowers at the 1976 Summer Olympics
Olympic bronze medalists for Romania
Olympic medalists in rowing
World Rowing Championships medalists for Romania
Medalists at the 1976 Summer Olympics
20th-century Romanian women